Trichopyrrhosia is a genus of parasitic flies in the family Tachinidae.

Species
Trichopyrrhosia uruhuasi Townsend, 1927

Distribution
Peru

References

Taxa named by Charles Henry Tyler Townsend
Endemic fauna of Peru
Diptera of South America
Dexiinae
Tachinidae genera
Monotypic Brachycera genera